The Patroon Island Bridge is a multi-span deck truss bridge that spans the Hudson River in Albany, New York.  A major crossing, it carries Interstate 90 in the east-west direction between Albany and Rensselaer Counties. It has been in service since 1968, with structural repairs made in 1992, and a comprehensive renovation/retrofit completed in 2016.

The bridge's name comes from the former Lower Patroon Island that once existed adjacent to the bridge, the channel of which dividing it from the western mainland was infilled for the construction of the bridge. A patroon was a proprietor of a tract of land in the 17th-century Dutch colony of New Netherland in North America.

Design
The bridge consists of ten spans. Seven spans are considered the main spans and consist of steel trusses and concrete decks. The other three spans are considered approach spans, which are supported by plate girders. There is an estimated  of clearance for shipping on the Hudson River below, which changes with the local tide. The average daily traffic count was 70,787 in 1998 with a 4.5 percent estimated traffic growth during the life of the bridge.

Renovation
The bridge's design is similar to that of the Interstate 35W bridge in Minneapolis, MN, which collapsed during rush hour on August 1, 2007.  This realization by New York State transportation officials prompted full-scale inspections of the state's major highway bridges, including the Patroon Island Bridge. Subsequently, the bridge was deemed safe for the time being, but would need substantial repairs and retrofitting in order to ensure motorist safety, and to extend its useful service life if replacement was found not to be a viable option in the near future.  On May 31, 2016, the New York State Department of Transportation declared that it had completed a $148-million-dollar renovation and rebuild of the bridge.

See also 

List of fixed crossings of the Hudson River

References

External links 

 Patroon Island Bridge at Capital Highways
 

Bridges completed in 1968
Bridges on the Interstate Highway System
Bridges over the Hudson River
Buildings and structures in Albany, New York
Bridges in Rensselaer County, New York
Interstate 90
Transportation in Albany, New York
Road bridges in New York (state)
Steel bridges in the United States
Bridges in Albany County, New York